Jeron Scott Mastrud (born December 17, 1987) is a former American football tight end of the National Football League (NFL). He was signed by the Tampa Bay Buccaneers as an undrafted free agent in 2010. He played college football at Kansas State.

He has also been a member of the New England Patriots, Miami Dolphins, Oakland Raiders and Chicago Bears.

Early years
Mastrud is the son of a Scholls Heights Elementary School teacher and a Southridge High School physical education teacher. Mastrud attended Southridge High School in Beaverton, Oregon, where he played football as a tight end, quarterback, and defensive end. As a senior, he completed 49 of 82 pass attempts for 731 yards and 10 touchdowns. He earned first-team All-Portland Metro League honors as a defensive end, and as a tight end was second-team all-league. He was also named to the third-team all-state as a defensive end.

College career
After graduating from high school, Mastrud attended Kansas State University, where he started 48 of a possible 49 games, including the final 26 of his career. His 106 career receptions rank first in school history among tight ends, and tenth among all positions, while his 1,219 career receiving yards are 18th in school history. Mastrud earned Academic All-Big 12 Conference honors the three years he was eligible, as well as being named to Academic All-District and All-American teams as a junior and senior.

Professional career

Tampa Bay Buccaneers
After going undrafted in the 2010 NFL Draft, Mastrud signed with the Tampa Bay Buccaneers on April 27, 2010. He played in four preseason games with the Buccaneers before being waived on September 4, 2010, during final cuts.

New England Patriots
Mastrud was signed to the practice squad of the New England Patriots on April 26, 2010, but was released the next day.

Miami Dolphins
The Miami Dolphins signed Mastrud to their practice squad on September 8, 2010. He was promoted to the team's 53-man roster on September 21, 2010, making his NFL debut as a reserve in the Dolphins' Week 3 game against the New York Jets on September 26.

Oakland Raiders
Mastrud was signed by Oakland Raiders on May 13, 2013.  At the end of the 2013 season Mastrud became a free agent.  He signed with the Bears on June 23, 2014.

Chicago Bears
Mastrud signed with the Bears on June 23, 2014. The Bears released Mastrud on August 29, 2014.

References

External links
Oakland Raiders bio
Miami Dolphins bio
New England Patriots bio
Tampa Bay Buccaneers bio

1987 births
Living people
Southridge High School (Beaverton, Oregon) alumni
Sportspeople from Beaverton, Oregon
Players of American football from Oregon
American football tight ends
Kansas State Wildcats football players
Tampa Bay Buccaneers players
New England Patriots players
Miami Dolphins players
Oakland Raiders players
Chicago Bears players